The 2006–07 2. Bundesliga was the 33rd season of the 2. Bundesliga, the second tier of Germany football league.

Karlsruher SC, FC Hansa Rostock and MSV Duisburg were promoted to the Bundesliga. Rot-Weiss Essen, SpVgg Unterhaching, SV Wacker Burghausen and Eintracht Braunschweig were relegated to the Regionalliga.

League table
For the 2006–07 season FC Augsburg, TuS Koblenz, FC Carl Zeiss Jena and Rot-Weiss Essen were newly promoted to the 2. Bundesliga from the Regionalliga while 1. FC Kaiserslautern, 1. FC Köln and MSV Duisburg had been relegated to the league from the Bundesliga.

Results

Top scorers

References

External links
 Official Site of the DFB 
 kicker.de 
 Official Bundesliga site  
 Official Bundesliga site 

2. Bundesliga seasons
2006–07 in German football leagues
Germany